Strobilomyces is a genus of boletes (mushrooms having a spongy mass of pores under the cap). The only well-known European species is the type species S. strobilaceus (also named S. floccopus), known in English as "old man of the woods".

Members of the genus can be distinguished by the following characteristics:
the cap and stipe are covered in soft hairy or woolly scales,
while most boletes have smooth elongated spores, those of Strobilomyces are roughly spherical and prominently ornamented, and
as might be expected from its "dry" fibrous appearance, it is resistant to decay (whereas most mushrooms in the Boletaceae are soft and decompose notoriously rapidly).

Taxonomy and classification

The genus name comes from the Ancient Greek word Strobilos (στρόβιλος), meaning "pine cone", a reference to the appearance of  S. strobilaceus.  The ending "-myces" is a standard suffix meaning "mushroom" (Ancient Greek: μύкης). In some older classification systems it is assigned to a separate family Strobilomycetaceae, but more recent phylogenetic evidence merges it into the larger family Boletaceae (suborder Boletineae). These results corroborate older DNA analyses by K. Høiland (1987), which suggested that Strobilomyces is only distantly related to more familiar boletes such as Suillus, but was in fact more closely related to the Earth Balls (Scleroderma).

Many more species have been discovered in warmer countries. The mycologist E. J. H. Corner described several new species from Malaysia including S. foveatus. According to recent estimates, about 40 species are known.

List of species
Strobilomyces alpinus — Yunnan province, China
Strobilomyces annulatus — Malaysia
Strobilomyces areolatus — China
Strobilomyces atrosquamosus — China
Strobilomyces benoisii
Strobilomyces camphoratus
Strobilomyces coccineus
Strobilomyces confusus — East Asia, North America (choice edible)
Strobilomyces dryophilus — (United States)
Strobilomyces echinatus
Strobilomyces echinocephalus — China
Strobilomyces excavatus
Strobilomyces foveatus — (Malaysia)
Strobilomyces fusisporus
Strobilomyces giganteus — Sichuan province, China
Strobilomyces gilbertianus — Democratic Republic of the Congo
Strobilomyces glabellus — Yunnan province, China
Strobilomyces glabriceps — China
Strobilomyces hongoi — Japan
Strobilomyces hydriensis
Strobilomyces latirimosus — Guangxi province, China
Strobilomyces ligulatus
Strobilomyces mirandus — Malaysia
Strobilomyces mollis — Malaysia
Strobilomyces nigricans — East Asia, North America
Strobilomyces pallescens
Strobilomyces parvirimosus — Yunnan province, China
Strobilomyces polypyramis — Malaysia
Strobilomyces porphyrius
Strobilomyces retisporus
Strobilomyces rufescens
Strobilomyces sanmingensis — China
Strobilomyces seminudus — Japan, China
Strobilomyces strobilaceus = S. floccopus — Asia, North America, Europe
Strobilomyces subnigricans — Hubei province, China
Strobilomyces subnudus — Jiangsu province, China
Strobilomyces velutinus — Yunnan province, China
Strobilomyces velutipes — Australia, Malaysia
Strobilomyces verruculosus – Japan
Strobilomyces zangii — China

References

External links

Boletaceae
Boletales genera